Ozyory is a town in Moscow Oblast, Russia, located on the left bank of the Oka River,  southeast of Moscow. Population:

History
It was first mentioned in 1578 as the village of Marvinskoye Ozerko. In the late 18th century, it was renamed Ozerki. In 1851, it received its present name Ozyory. It was granted town status in 1925.

Administrative and municipal status
Within the framework of administrative divisions, it is, together with fifty-nine rural localities, incorporated as Ozyory Town Under Oblast Jurisdiction—an administrative unit with the status equal to that of the districts. As a municipal division, Ozyory City Under Oblast Jurisdiction is incorporated as Ozyory Urban Okrug.

Administrative and municipal history
Ozyorsky Municipal District was abolished on March 30, 2015, with its territory reorganized as Ozyory Urban Okrug. Within the framework of administrative divisions, on April 13, 2015 the inhabited localities of the low-level administrative divisions (the rural settlements) were subordinated to the Town of Ozyory, which remained the only subdivision of the administrative district. The administrative district itself was abolished on May 16, 2015, with its territory reorganized as Ozyory Town Under Oblast Jurisdiction.

Twin towns and sister cities

Ozyory is twinned with:
 Dzerzhinsky, Russia

Former twin towns:
 Radom, Poland

On 28 February 2022, the Polish city of Radom ended its partnership with Ozyory as a reaction to the 2022 Russian invasion of Ukraine.

Further reading
The town was profiled at the turn of the millennium by author Jeffrey Tayler as the subject of a travel narrative piece "Exiled Beyond Kilometer 101" for The Atlantic (then still known as The Atlantic Monthly): Part 1, Part 2

Notable residents 

Mikhail Katukov (1900–1976), Red Army commander, born in the village of Bolshoe Uvarovo

References

Notes

Sources

Cities and towns in Moscow Oblast